ShareX is a free and open-source screenshot and screencast program for Microsoft Windows. It is published under the GNU General Public License. The project's source code is hosted on GitHub. It is also available on the Microsoft Store and Steam.

Features

Screenshots
ShareX can be used to capture full screen or partial screenshots (which can be exported into various image formats), such as rectangle capture and window capture. It can also record animated GIF files and video using FFmpeg. 

An included image editor lets users annotate captured screenshots, or modify it with borders, image effects, watermarks, etc. It's also possible to use the editor to draw on top of the windows or desktop before taking the screenshot.

Sharing
After capture, a screenshot can be automatically exported as an image file, email attachment, exported to a printer, to the clipboard, or uploaded to a remote host such as many popular image hosting services or via FTP. If the image is uploaded to a remote host, the URL generated by it can be copied to the clipboard.

Dragging other file types into the program will upload them to a destination based on type, such as a text file being saved to Pastebin and a ZIP file saved to Dropbox.

Other tools

There are a variety of desktop image capabilities including screen color picker and selector, checksum tool (hash check), on-screen ruler, image combiner, thumbnails for images and video, and many more.

The program also includes some basic automation. For example, taking a screenshot, adding a border and watermark, and then saving to a specific folder.

Development
Work on a project called ZScreen began in 2007, hosted on SourceForge and moved to Google Code in 2008. In 2010, a parallel project called ZUploader was started to rewrite ZScreen's core from scratch. In 2012, all of ZScreen's features had been ported to ZUploader which was subsequently repackaged and released as ShareX. In 2013, the project was moved to GitHub due to Google Code dropping support for hosting downloads.

Reviews
 TechRadar gave the program 4.5 out of 5 stars and listed it among their 2021 Best Screen Recorders.
 The Guardian's 2018 article on the "best replacement for the Windows 10 Snipping Tool" lists ShareX first, with the caveat that it's powerful and probably "overkill for most users".
 The Verge's article listed ShareX among the 2021 great apps to have for Windows 11.
 Lifehacker made a 2022 article about ShareX being the Best Screenshot Tool for Windows with a complete usage guide.
 Microsoft listed ShareX as the best Utility App in the 2022 Microsoft Store Community Choice Awards.

See also

 Comparison of screencasting software

References

External links
 
 
 ShareX Review

Free raster graphics editors
Free software programmed in C Sharp
Free utility software
Screencasting software
Screenshot software
Utilities for Windows
Windows-only free software